Terrawars: New York Invasion is a sci-fi first-person shooter computer game developed by Ladyluck Digital Media, first released by Tri Synergy on June 28, 2006. Designed for PCs running on Microsoft Windows, the game uses the Lithtech Jupiter engine used in No One Lives Forever 2: A Spy in H.A.R.M.'s Way.

Gameplay
The player assumes the role of John Armstrong, a medical student with the National Guard who must repel an alien invasion.

Development
The development team took about 5,000 digital photos of Downtown New York City and used many references about Manhattan to replicate the real-life locations in-game.

Reception 
The game was met with universally negative reviews. The game's sound, graphics, and gameplay was criticized all around.

References

External links 

Ladyluck Digital Media
GameSpot Review

2006 video games
First-person shooters
Science fiction video games
Video games developed in the Philippines
Video games set in New York City
Windows games
Windows-only games
LithTech games
Tri Synergy games
Multiplayer and single-player video games
G2 Games games